Sir Robin Mountfield, KCB (16 October 1939 – 9 November 2011) was a British civil servant, who retired in 1999 from his most senior post as Permanent Secretary at the Cabinet Office.

Early life and education
Mountfield was born on 16 October 1939. He attended Merchant Taylors' School, Crosby and then Magdalen College, Oxford.

Career
He joined the Ministry of Power in 1961. He rose to the rank of Deputy Secretary in the Department of Trade and Industry in 1984, where he served until 1992 when he transferred to HM Treasury. In 1995 he moved to the Cabinet Office as Permanent Secretary responsible for the Office of Public Service there (the remainder of the Office of Public Service and Science after the Office of Science and Technology transferred to DTI). In 1998, his role was re-cast as Permanent Secretary at the Cabinet Office, in which he served until his retirement in 1999.

Personal life
In 1963, Mountfield married Anne Newsham. Together they had two sons and a daughter. His daughter, Helen Mountfield, is a barrister and the Principal of Mansfield College, Oxford.

He died on 9 November 2011.

Honours 
Mountfield was appointed a Companion of the Order of the Bath (CB) in the 1988 Birthday Honours. He was promoted to Knight Commander of the Order of the Bath (KCB) in the 1999 New Year Honours shortly after his retirement.

Styles
 Mr Robin Mountfield (1939–1988)
 Mr Robin Mountfield CB (1998–1999)
 Sir Robin Mountfield KCB (1999-2011)

Offices held

References

External links 
 "Obituary - Sir Robin Mountfield", The Telegraph, 15 November 2011
 "Obituary - Sir Robin Mountfield", University of Essex, 19 December 2011

1939 births
2011 deaths
Knights Companion of the Order of the Bath
Civil servants in the Cabinet Office
Permanent Secretaries of the Cabinet Office
Private secretaries in the British Civil Service